Zobeyd va Dabbat (also Romanized as Zobeyd va Dabbāt; also known as Zobeydeh Dūbāt) is a village in Ahudasht Rural District, Shavur District, Shush County, Khuzestan Province, Iran. At the 2006 census, its population was 710, in 110 families.

References 

Populated places in Shush County